Inspire Films Private Limited is a television content company under Beyond Dreams Entertainment Private Limited. The company has produced shows including Ek Veer Ki Ardaas...Veera, Sadda Haq, Kuch Rang Pyar Ke Aise Bhi, and Ishq Mein Marjawan.

Current Productions

Upcoming Productions

Former productions

References

External links
 Official website

Mass media companies established in 2007
Companies based in Mumbai
Television production companies of India
Entertainment companies of India
2007 establishments in Maharashtra
Indian companies established in 2007